Proletarskaya is a station on the Avtozavodskaya line of the Nizhny Novgorod Metro. It opened on 20 November 1985 and was one of six initial stations of the Metro.

It is in the Leninsky district of Nizhny Novgorod. From its opening until 1987, when Avtozavodskaya station opened, it was the southern terminus of the line.

References

Nizhny Novgorod Metro stations
Railway stations in Russia opened in 1985
1985 establishments in the Soviet Union
Railway stations located underground in Russia